Russian low-cost airline Pobeda serves the following destinations:

List

References

Lists of airline destinations